Ireland competed at the 2004 Summer Olympics in Athens, Greece, from 13 to 29 August 2004. This was the nation's eighteenth appearance at the Summer Olympics.

The Olympic Council of Ireland sent a total of 46 athletes to the Games, 32 men and 14 women, to compete in nine sports. The International Olympic Committee allowed athletes from Northern Ireland the option to compete at the Olympic games for either Great Britain and Northern Ireland, or for Ireland. Ireland's Olympic campaign for the Games started with a controversy, as middle-distance runner Cathal Lombard failed a drug test for EPO, and was not allowed to compete.

Originally, Ireland left Athens with only a gold medal from show jumper Cian O'Connor. On 8 October 2004, International Federation for Equestrian Sports announced that Waterford Crystal, owned by O'Connor, failed a horse doping test for fluphenazine and zuclopenthixol that formally stripped off O'Connor's Olympic title in early 2005. Because O'Connor decided not to appeal, he was formally stripped of his Olympic title, which was awarded to silver medalist Rodrigo Pessoa of Brazil.

Athletics 

Irish athletes achieved qualifying standards in the following athletics events (up to a maximum of three athletes in each event at the 'A' Standard, and 1 at the 'B' Standard). Middle-distance runner Cathal Lombard was initially selected to the team, but he failed a drug test for EPO, and was not allowed to compete.

Men
Track & road events

Field events

Women
Track & road events

Boxing 

Ireland sent one boxer to the 2004 Summer Olympics.

Canoeing

Slalom

Cycling

Road

Mountain biking

Equestrian

Dressage

Eventing

"#" indicates that the score of this rider does not count in the team competition, since only the best three results of a team are counted.

Show jumping

* Cian O'Connor originally claimed the gold medal in the individual show jumping, but was disqualified after his horse Waterford Crystal failed the horse doping test for fluphenazine and zuclopenthixol.

Rowing

Men

Qualification Legend: FA=Final A (medal); FB=Final B (non-medal); FC=Final C (non-medal); FD=Final D (non-medal); FE=Final E (non-medal); FF=Final F (non-medal); SA/B=Semifinals A/B; SC/D=Semifinals C/D; SE/F=Semifinals E/F; R=Repechage

Sailing

Men

Women

Open

M = Medal race; OCS = On course side of the starting line; DSQ = Disqualified; DNF = Did not finish; DNS= Did not start; RDG = Redress given

Shooting 

Ireland qualified one shooter.

Men

Swimming 

Men

Women

See also
 Ireland at the 2004 Summer Paralympics

References

External links

Olympic Council of Ireland

Nations at the 2004 Summer Olympics
2004 Summer Olympics
Summer Olympics